Blackburn College is a further and higher education college in Blackburn,  North West England.

History
Blackburn College started as Blackburn Technical College, which was established in 1888 by public subscription. It originally specialised in engineering and textiles, later introducing tertiary courses, such as A–levels in 1984.

Locations
The main campus is located close to Blackburn Town Centre, and consists of several buildings.

Development
In the 2000s, four phases of construction were announced, as the college aimed to modernise its campus, and increase the range of degrees offered.

The first was St Paul's Centre, with IT and sixth form facilities, which was completed in 2007 at a cost of £8.8 million, and was opened in September 2007 by John Sentamu. Construction of this building began in July 2006. Phase 2, the University Centre, was completed in 2009, costing £14 million, and was opened in September 2009, by Labour MP Jack Straw and then Blackburn Rovers manager Sam Allardyce.

Phase 3 of the re development is the largest building in the entire programme, the £18.3 million Beacon Centre, opposite the Construction Centre on St. Paul's Street, which was completed in the end of 2011, and was opened in February 2012, by chair of governors Sir Bill Taylor and The X Factor finalist Amelia Lily. It includes teaching spaces, for art and photography studios and IT suites, as well as a male and female multi faith prayer room.

In July 2012, demolition of the 1960s Feilden Street building, which housed the colleges Sixth Form until the St Paul's Centre in 2007, began (with a little help from Mark Felix), making room for Phase 4, as well as Phase 5. In September 2013, Phase 4 of the re development, the STEM(MM) (Science, Technology, Engineering and Maths (Media and Music)) building opened, the Sir Bill Taylor Futures Centre, which is named after the long running governor, and is placed next to the University Centre.

In September 2014, the college's new Regional Automotive Hub opened, and was officially opened in August 2014 by Carl Fogarty, and has had developed input by representatives from both Nissan and Škoda. The Regional Automotive Hub is Phase 5 of the colleges re development, and possibly one of the last buildings to be built, along with a new leisure centre, which was opened in March 2015 by Rebecca Adlington. Construction began in November 2013, and was completed in August 2014. It was originally set to open in September 2014, a month after the opening of the Regional Automotive Hub.

It is called Blackburn Sports & Leisure Centre, and includes a six lane pool, learner pool, two sports halls, gym, aerobics studio, wet/dry changing facilities, as well as a new coach drop off point. It replaces the 1980s Waves Water Fun Centre, opened by Princess Anne, which closed in February 2015, and was demolished during March 2016.

Reports
In January 2008, the college was rated as outstanding in an Ofsted report, which took place in November 2007. In September 2008, it was one of five colleges in the North West to be awarded Beacon status by the Quality Improvement Agency.

The College currently has a status of Good with Ofsted after being inspected in January 2022.

See also
 Sir Robert Howson Pickard FRS, head of chemistry and principal 1900 to 1920, later Vice-Chancellor of the University of London from 1937 to 1939.

References

External links
 Centenary Booklet This Centenary Booklet commemorates 100 years of service by Blackburn College to the Community of Blackburn, Darwen and East Lancashire. It highlights significant stages in the growth and development of the College from its foundation in May 1888 to the visit in 1988 by Prince Charles.

Buildings and structures in Blackburn
Education in Blackburn with Darwen
Further education colleges in Lancashire
Learning and Skills Beacons